Youcef Bechou (born March 1, 1997 in Douéra) is an Algerian footballer who plays for C.D. Trofense.

Career
On August 25, 2017, Bechou made his professional debut for CR Belouizdad as a second-half substitute against USM Bel Abbès.
In 2021, Bechou signed a loan contract with Olympique de Médéa.

References

External links
 

1997 births
Algeria under-23 international footballers
Algerian footballers
Algerian Ligue Professionnelle 1 players
CR Belouizdad players
USM Alger players
Footballers from Algiers
Living people
Association football midfielders
21st-century Algerian people
C.D. Trofense players
Algerian expatriate footballers
Algerian expatriates in Portugal
Expatriate footballers in Portugal
Olympique de Médéa players
Liga Portugal 2 players